The Kudobin Islands are a group of small islands in the Bering Sea, near the coast of Alaska,  west of Port Moller, Bristol Bay Low. The group includes a cluster of other small coastal islands,  the Walrus and Kritskoi Islands, forming a geographical whole.

The Kudobin Islands are close to Nelson Lagoon. The islands are flat, the highest point on theme being .

Etymology 
These coastal islands were surveyed by Andrew Khudobin (IRN, one of Captain Fyodor Petrovich Litke's naval officers in 1828. Khudobin named the group  or Wolf Island, according to Lutke. Lutke (1836, p. 263) called the group Khoudobine. Its present name, Khudobin Island, was given in 1882 by W. H. Dall, USC&GS.

References

Islands of the Aleutian Islands
Islands of Aleutians East Borough, Alaska
Islands of Alaska